MGM Channel can refer to:

 MGM Networks
 MGM (TV channel)
 MGM Channel (Canada)
 MGM Channel (European TV channel)
 Canal MGM Spain
 MGM HD

See also 
 MGM/UA (disambiguation)
 MGM (disambiguation)